Metin Akan (born 28 May 1983 in Bursa, Turkey) is a Turkish professional footballer who plays for Bursa Zaferspor.

Club career
Akan began his career with the local clubs A. Vefikpaşaspor and K. Kooperatifspor. He joined Bursaspor in 2001, where he played until 2004. Akan moved to another Bursa-based club, İnegölspor, on 24 August 2004. Manisaspor transferred him in 2006, and he joined his current club MKE Ankaragücü in 2008.

References

External links

1983 births
Living people
Sportspeople from Bursa
Turkish footballers
Bursaspor footballers
İnegölspor footballers
Manisaspor footballers
MKE Ankaragücü footballers
İstanbul Başakşehir F.K. players
Adanaspor footballers
Süper Lig players
Turkey youth international footballers
Association football midfielders
Association football forwards